Calguia deltophora is a species of snout moth in the genus Calguia. It was described by Oswald Bertram Lower in 1903. It is found in Australia.

References

Moths described in 1903
Phycitini